Megachile lagopoda is a species of bee in the family Megachilidae. It was described by Carl Linnaeus in 1761.

References

Lagopoda
Insects described in 1761
Taxa named by Carl Linnaeus